Barumba Beatrice Rusaniya (born 2 December 1964) is a female Ugandan politician. She was the National Resistance Movement politician and the  Member of Parliament for Kiruhura District in the eighth and ninth Parliament of Uganda. In 2005, when  Kiruhura district was created out of Mbarara District, Beatrice became its pioneer Woman Member of Parliament in 2006 and served until 2016.

Political life 
In the 2016 to 2021 elections, she lost the elections. She withdrew the election petition she filed challenging the election of her successor, Sheila Mwine Kabaije with allegation that the election exercise was marred with a lot of rigging among other irregularities. Rusaniya was one of  the Uganda’s representatives in the Pan African Parliament. However, she was sick during the delegation.

See also 

 List of members of the ninth Parliament of Uganda
 List of members of the eighth Parliament of Uganda
 Sheila Mwine Kabaije
 Kiruhura District
 National Resistance Movement
 Parliament of Uganda
 Member of Parliament

External links 

 Website of the Parliament of Uganda

References

Living people
People from Kiruhura District
National Resistance Movement politicians
Ugandan women
Members of the Parliament of Uganda
1964 births